Dmitri Aleksandrovich Burmistrov (born 14 October 1983) is a Russian former professional footballer.

Club career
He made his debut in the Russian Premier League in 2004 for FC Rostov.

References

1983 births
Sportspeople from Tula, Russia
Living people
Russian footballers
FC Rostov players
FC SKA Rostov-on-Don players
FC Chernomorets Novorossiysk players
FC Salyut Belgorod players
Russian Premier League players
FC Torpedo Moscow players
Association football forwards
FC Avangard Kursk players
FC Energomash Belgorod players